The 2022–23 Algerian Ligue Professionnelle 1 is the 61st season of the Algerian Ligue Professionnelle 1. A total of 16 teams contested the league. It began on 26 August 2022 and will conclude in May 2023.

Teams
16 teams contest the league. MC El Bayadh and USM Khenchela were promoted from the 2021–22 Algerian Ligue 2.

Stadiums
Note: Table lists in alphabetical order.

Personnel and kits

Managerial changes

Foreign players

League table

Results

Positions by round

Clubs season-progress

Season statistics

Top scorers

Updated to games played on 18 March 2023 Source: soccerway.com

Hat-tricks

Monthly awards

Media coverage

See also
2022–23 Algerian Ligue 2

References

Algerian Ligue Professionnelle 1 seasons
Algeria
Ligue Pro. 1